Teresa Labriola (17 February 1873 – 6 February 1941) was an Italian writer, jurist, and feminist. The daughter of Antonio Labriola, a renowned Marxist thinker, Labriola served as the first Italian woman lawyer.

Life
From the time she was a student, Teresa Labriola was passionately involved in the nascent Italian feminist movement. Upon graduating, she held the position of Professor of Law at the University of Rome, making her the first female lawyer in Italy.

With the outbreak of World War I, Labriola embraced interventionist and nationalist positions, distancing herself from her family's Marxist convictions and becoming highly critical of socialism and communism.

During the fascist period in Italy before the Second World War, Labriola was one of the regime's most perseverant propagandists, stating that a woman's primary role was to be a mother and that education was secondary. However she eventually became disillusioned with the fascist regime after women became increasingly excluded from public life in Italy. She died in poverty after a long illness.

References

1873 births
1941 deaths
Academic staff of the Sapienza University of Rome
Italian women's rights activists
Italian women writers
Place of birth missing
Italian women lawyers
Italian women academics